UACV may stand for:
 Unmanned aerial combat vehicle: see Unmanned combat aerial vehicle
 Unpasteurized apple cider vinegar or unfiltered apple cider vinegar: see Apple cider vinegar